{{Infobox writer
| name         = Eduard Limonov
| image        = File:Eduard Limonov - 2018.jpg
| alt          = 
| caption      = Limonov in 2018
| pseudonym    = 
| birth_name   = Eduard Veniaminovich Savenko
| birth_date   = 
| birth_place  = Dzerzhinsk, Gorky Oblast, Russian SFSR, Soviet Union
| death_date   = 
| death_place  = Moscow, Russia
| occupation   = Writer, poet, essayist, publicist, leader of The Other Russia, former leader of the National Bolshevik Party, editor of newspaper Limonka
| nationality  = Russian
| citizenship  = Soviet (1943–74)Stateless (1974–1987)French (1987–2011)Russian (1992–2020)
| education    = 
| alma_mater   = Kharkiv National Pedagogical University
| period       = 1958–2020
| genre        = Novel, poetry, short story, autobiography, political essay
| subject      = 
| movement     = Postmodernism (Russian postmodernism)
| notableworks = It's Me, EddieHis Butler's StoryA Young ScoundrelMemoir of a Russian PunkThe Book of Water| spouse       = 
| partner      = Anna RubinshteinYelena ShchapovaNatalya Medvedeva (1983–1995)Yekaterina Volkova
| children     = BogdanAlexandra
| relatives    = 
| awards       = 
| signature    = 
| website      = 
| portaldisp   = 
| module       = 
}}

Eduard Veniaminovich Savenko (22 February 1943 – 17 March 2020), known by his pen name Eduard Limonov, was a Russian writer, poet, publicist, political dissident and politician.

He emigrated from the USSR in 1974, but returned to Russia in 1991, where he founded the National Bolshevik Party. The Party was banned in the country in 2007 and superseded by The Other Russia. In the 2000s, he was one of the leaders of The Other Russia coalition of opposition forces.

Biography
Early life, 1943–1966
Limonov was born in the Soviet Union, in Dzerzhinsk, an industrial town in the Gorky Oblast (now Nizhny Novgorod Oblast). Limonov's fatherthen in the military servicewas in a state security career and his mother was a homemaker. In the early years of his life his family moved to Kharkiv in the Ukrainian SSR, where Limonov grew up. He studied at the H.S. Skovoroda Kharkiv National Pedagogical University.

By Limonov's own account, he began writing "very bad" poetry at the age of thirteen and soon after became involved in theft and petty crime as an adolescent hooligan. Limonov adopted his pen name for use in literary circles during this time.

Konkret poets in Moscow, 1966–1974
In 1966, together with his first actual wife, Anna Moiseevna Rubinstein, (their marriage was not registered officially) he first came to Moscow, earning money sewing trousers (Limonov "dressed" many in the intelligentsia; sculptor Ernst Neizvestny and poet Bulat Okudzhava among others), but later returned to Kharkov.

Limonov moved to Moscow again in 1967, marrying a fellow poet, Yelena Shchapova, in a Russian Orthodox ceremony in 1973. During his period in Moscow, Limonov was involved in the Konkret poets' group and sold volumes of his self-published poetry while doing various day jobs. Having achieved a degree of success in this manner by the mid-1970s, and he and his wife emigrated from the Soviet Union in 1974. The exact circumstances of Limonov's departure are unclear and have been described differently. Reportedly, KGB secret police gave him a choice either to become a informant, or leave the country.

Literary exile in New York, 1974–1980
Although neither he nor Shchapova were Jewish, the Soviet Union issued permission for the couple to emigrate to Israel, but soon after the couple arrived in the United States. Limonov settled in New York City, where he and Shchapova soon divorced.

Limonov worked for a Russian-language newspaper as a proofreader and occasionally interviewed recent Soviet emigrants. Like Eddie, the immigrant protagonist of Limonov's first novel It's Me, Eddie, Limonov was drawn to punk subculture and radical politics. Limonov's New York acquaintances included Studio 54's Steve Rubell and a Trotskyist group, the Socialist Workers Party. As protagonist Eddie finds out as a consequence, the latter is a political target of the FBI. Limonov was himself harassed by the FBI. As he later recounted, the FBI interrogated dozens of his acquaintances, once asking a friend about "Lermontov" in Paris when he had resettled in France. 

The first chapter of It's Me, Eddie, was published by an Israeli Russian-language journal. Finished by 1977, it was consistently rejected by publishers in the United States and only brought out a few years after becoming an instant success in France in 1980. In interviews, Limonov says this was because the book was not written with anti-Soviet tones, like other Russian literature admired in the United States.

In New York, Limonov also discovered another side of the American Dream. After being a dissident, he lived a poor life due to his low revenues. He managed to afford a room in a miserable hostel and spent time with homeless persons, some of whom he had casual sexual intercourse with, as related in ‘’It’s me, Eddie’’, published in France under the title Le poète russe préfère les grands nègres. He then found a job as a butler for a millionaire in the Upper East Side. This period of his life led him to write autobiographical texts, including His Butler's Story.

Limonov's stay in Paris, 1980–1991
Finally, disillusioned with the country he termed "a damned outhouse bereft of spirit or purpose on the outskirts of civilization", Limonov left America for Paris with his lover Natalya Medvedeva in 1980, where he became active in French literary circles. He swore to never return to the United States, and never did. Having remained stateless for thirteen years, he was granted French citizenship in 1987. Limonov and Medvedeva got married in 1982; the pair split up by 1995.

Return to Russia and the foundation of NBP, 1991–2000 
In 1991, Limonov returned to Russia from France, restored his citizenship and became active in politics.

Limonov was a strong supporter of Serbia in the wars that followed the breakup of Yugoslavia and participated in a sniper patrol in Bosnia and Herzegovina during the Bosnian War. Paweł Pawlikowski's film Serbian Epics includes footage of Limonov travelling to the front lines of Sarajevo in 1992 with Radovan Karadžić, then the Bosnian Serb president and later a convicted war criminal, and firing a few rounds with a machine gun in the direction of the besieged city.. osa.ceu.hu When asked about the incident in 2010, Limonov claimed he had been shooting at a target range and that Pawlikowski added an extra frame to make it appear he had fired on an apartment complex. This explanation has been challenged. On another occasion, Limonov said that he "celebrated his 50th birthday in Kninska Krajina [...] by firing from a Russian-made heavy gun at Croatian Army headquarters." During the 1990s, he supported Bosnian Serbs in the Yugoslav wars; and Abkhaz and Transnistrian secessionists against Georgia and Moldova, respectively.

Limonov was also initially an ally of Vladimir Zhirinovsky and was named as Security Minister in a shadow cabinet formed by Zhirinovsky in 1992. However Limonov soon tired of Zhirinovsky, accusing him of moderateness and of approaching the president and consequently split from him, publishing the book "Limonov against Zhirinovsky" (1994).

In 1993,  together with figures like Aleksandr Dugin and Yegor Letov, he founded the National Bolshevik Party which started to publish a newspaper called Limonka (the Russian nickname for the lemon-shaped F1 hand grenade; also a play on his pen name Limonov).

In 1996, a Russian court judged in a hearing that the NBP paper Limonka had disseminated illegal and immoral information: "in essence, E. V. Limonov (Savenko) is an advocate of revenge and mass terror, raised to the level of state policy."  The court decided to recommend issuing an official warning to Limonka, to investigate the possibility of examining whether Limonov could be held legally responsible, and to publish its decision in Rossiiskaia gazeta. After that, a criminal case was launched against him on charges of incitement of ethnic hatred.

On the Ukrainian Independence Day 24 August 1999, Limonov along with 15 other supporters from the top of the city's clock tower in Sevastopol publicly called to review the status of the city and not to ratify Treaty about Friendship and Cooperation between Russia and Ukraine by the State Duma.

 Jail and protest activities, 2001–2013 
Limonov was jailed in April 2001 on charges of terrorism, the forced overthrow of the constitutional order, and the illegal purchase of weapons.  Based on an article published in Limonka under Limonov's byline, the government accused Limonov of planning to raise an army to invade Kazakhstan.  After one year in jail, his trial was heard in a Saratov court, which also heard appeals from Russian Duma members Vladimir Zhirinovsky, Alexei Mitrofanov and Vasiliy Shandybin for his release.  He maintained that the charges were ridiculous and politically motivated, but was convicted and sentenced to four years imprisonment for the arms purchasing, while the other charges were dropped. He served almost two years before being paroled for good behavior. He wrote eight books while in jail.

In 2006, Limonov married the actress Yekaterina Volkova. They had a son, Bogdan, and a daughter, Alexandra. They split up in 2008.

On 19 April 2007, the Moscow City Court banned the National Bolshevik Party as extremist. The decision was upheld by the Supreme Court.

Limonov continued his political activities as one of the leaders of The Other Russia, along with liberal, nationalist and communist politicians. He took part in various protests and was one of the organizers of the Dissenters' Marches. In particular, on 3 March 2007, Limonov was detained by police in the very beginning of the rally the first Saint Petersburg Dissenters' March; on 14 April 2007, Limonov was arrested again after an anti-government rally in Moscow; on 31 January 2009 was detained again in Moscow.

In July 2009, he helped organise the Strategy-31 series of protests.

Soon, Limonov split up with the liberal opposition. In July 2010, he and his followers established The Other Russia political party, as the informal successor to the NBP. It was denied official registration in 2010 and in 2019, after it got re-established without Limonov as formally part of its leadership.

 Later life and death, 2013–2020 
Since 2014, Limonov supported the annexation of Crimea, the unrecognized DNR and LNR, and encouraged Russians to take part in the Russo-Ukrainian War on a Russian side.

He died on 17 March 2020 in Moscow. It was reported that Limonov had been battling cancer; complications from two surgery procedures such as 
throat problems, struggles with oncology, and inflammation were cited as the direct cause of his death.

 Literary work 

Limonov's works are known for their cynicism. His novels are also (to an extent, fictive) memoirs, describing his experiences as a youth in Russia and as émigré in the United States.

In 2007, the Swiss novelist Christian Kracht wrote to American businessman David Woodard, "Solzhenitsyn has described Limonov as 'a little insect who writes pornography,' while Limonov described Solzhenitsyn as a traitor to his homeland who contributed to the downfall of the USSR. Ad Marginem  publishes my friend Eduard Limonov’s novels. Your obedient servant—Christian Eduard Kracht (truthfully my middle name)"

Limonov's works were scandalous for the Russian public, once they began to be published in the USSR during the late perestroika era. Particularly noted is It's Me, Eddie, which contained numerous pornographic descriptions of homosexual acts involving the narrator. The author later argued that such scenes were purely fiction; however, his fellow Russian nationalists were nevertheless appalled by such descriptions in Limonov's work. Thus, the Neo-Nazi leader Alexander Barkashov remarked to a journalist of Komsomolskaya Pravda concerning Limonov: ″Если лидер педераст, то он родину продаст.″ (″If the leader is a pederast, he will betray the fatherland″)

Russian film director and screenwriter Aleksandr Veledinskii's 2004 feature film Russkoe ("Russian") is based on Limonov's writings.

In late 1990s and early 2000s, Limonov was a regular contributor to "Living Here" and later to the eXile, both English-language newspapers in Moscow. These were the only known sources where Limonov wrote articles in English. When he joined as a contributor, he specifically asked the editors of the paper that they preserve his "terrible Russian-English style." Although most of his featured articles were political, he also wrote on many topics, including "advice for ambitious youngsters."

 Influences 
Limonov expressed that his favorite poet was Velimir Khlebnikov.  Japanese writer Yukio Mishima is noted, by some observers, as an influence on Limonov's writing.

 Works about Limonov 
Eduard Limonov's life is related in detail by Emmanuel Carrère in his 2011 biographical novel Limonov and in the Adam Curtis documentary series Can't Get You Out of My Head. English actor Ben Whishaw will portray Limonov in a film by Kirill Serebrennikov, based on Carrère's novel.

Selected bibliography
BooksIt's Me, EddieHis Butler's Story, first published in English by Grove Press, 1987. Translated by Judson RosengrantMemoir of a Russian Punk, Grove Weidenfeld, 1990. Translated by Judson RosengrantМолодой Нeгодяй (A Young Scoundrel), translated by John Dolan
My Political Biography
 (English), translated by Sofia Arenzon
Russian Psycho
Control Shot
The Holy Monsters
Imprisoned by Dead Men
 (English), translated by Sofia Arenzon
The Book of Water
The Wild Girl
American Vacation
The Great Mother of Love
Anatomy of a Hero
Disappearance of Barbarians
How to be Mad and Happy at Fifty-Five

Interview
Eduard Limonov: Each year I get closer to Islam
Limonov’s dialogue with a Voice about Thanksgiving
Eduard Limonov: It’s a Great Time of Struggle

Essays
Doctor Limonov’s advices to ambitious youngsters 
Punk and national-bolshevism
Foreword of The Exile: Sex, Drugs, and Libel in the New RussiaFilmography
Documentaries
 Saratov (2003)
 Da, smert (2004), by Alyona Polunina 
 The Revolution That Wasn't (2008), by Alyona Polunina 
 SrokFilms
 Russkoe'' (2004), by Alexander Veledinsky – screening of several Limonov's novels

See also
Aleksandr Dugin
Yegor Letov

References

External links

Official blog of Eduard Limonov in LJ
Official blog of Eduard Limonov in VK
LJ-community: «Eduard Limonov without politic»
The Other Russia official blog of Limonov's political party
The Other Russia official web page of Limonov's political party
All books of Eduard Limonov

Limonka – official website of the newspaper

 
1943 births
2020 deaths
Counterculture of the 1990s
People from Dzerzhinsk, Russia
National Bolsheviks
Prisoners and detainees of Russia
Russian nationalists
Russian male novelists
Soviet novelists
Soviet male writers
20th-century Russian poets
20th-century Russian male writers
Prix Jean Freustié winners
Russian political writers
Russian writers
Russian prisoners and detainees
Russian people of Ukrainian descent
Soviet dissidents
Defenders of the White House (1993)
National Bolshevik Party politicians
Neo-fascist politicians
Russian dissidents
The Other Russia (coalition)
Anti-Ukrainian sentiment
Soviet expellees
People denaturalized by the Soviet Union
Soviet emigrants to the United States
Inmates of Lefortovo Prison
Russian political party founders
Russian columnists